Alucita pseudohuebneri is a moth of the family Alucitidae. It is found in Turkey and Iran.

References

Moths described in 1997
Alucitidae
Moths of the Middle East